The Sumba myzomela (Myzomela dammermani) is a species of bird in the family Meliphagidae. It is endemic to Sumba in the western Lesser Sunda Islands of Indonesia, where it is found in forest with a significant component of deciduous trees.

References

Sumba myzomela
Birds of Sumba
Sumba myzomela
Taxonomy articles created by Polbot